Baghestan (also Romanized as Bāghestān; also known as Maḩalleh-ye Bāghestān) is a village in Shirkuh Rural District, in the Central District of Taft County, Yazd Province, Iran. At the 2006 census, its population was 46, in 21 families.

References 

Populated places in Taft County